Hernán Guillermo Muñoz Espinoza (born 9 August 1988) is a Chilean footballer. His currently club is Ñublense.

Club career

Statistics

References

1988 births
Living people
Chilean footballers
Municipal Mejillones footballers
Deportes Linares footballers
Santiago Morning footballers
San Marcos de Arica footballers
Primera B de Chile players
Association football goalkeepers
People from Talca